Česká Bříza (until 1948 Německá Bříza; , in 1948–1949 Břízka) is a municipality and village in Plzeň-North District in the Plzeň Region of the Czech Republic. It has about 600 inhabitants.

References

Villages in Plzeň-North District